Chesneya elegans is a flowering plant species in the genus Chesneya found in Turkey.

References 

Galegeae
Plants described in 1905